The following lists events that happened during 2015 in Chile.

Incumbents
 President: Michelle Bachelet (Socialist)

Events

March 
 March 3 – The Villarrica volcano erupted in southern Chile leading to the evacuation of 3,000 people.
 March 24-25 – in the 2015 Chilean storm, an unusual cold core prompts excessive rainfall and flooding in Atacama

April 
 April 22 – The Calbuco volcano erupted.

June
June 11 – In football, the 44th Copa América took place across Chile.

September
September 16 – Magnitude 8.3 earthquake strikes 54km W of Illapel.

Deaths
May 8 – Juan Schwanner, Hungarian-Chilean footballer and manager (b. 1921)
July 4 – Carlo de Gavardo, motorcycle racer (b. 1969)

References

 
Years of the 21st century in Chile
2010s in Chile
Chile
Chile